The surname Seton-Watson may refer to:
Christopher Seton-Watson (1918-2007), Scottish historian; brother of Hugh and son of R.W.
Hugh Seton-Watson (1916–1984), British historian and political scientist
Robert William Seton-Watson (1879–1951), also known by the pseudonym Scotus Viator, British political activist and historian

See also
Seton (surname)
Watson (surname)

Compound surnames
English-language surnames